Taibe, meaning "The goodly", is a Muslim Arab village in northeastern Israel on the  Issachar Plateau. It falls under the jurisdiction of Gilboa Regional Council.

History

Remains from the Hellenistic, Roman, Byzantine, Crusader, and Mamluk periods have been found.

Biblical identification
"the goodly"), as was common in other Arabic place-names.

Bronze Age to Byzantine period
It has been proposed that Taibe was Tubi, listed among the places paying tribute to Thutmose III.

North east of the village sarcophagus remains have been found. This area apparently functioned as a graveyard during the Roman and Byzantine eras.

In 2021, archaeologist announced the discovery of an engraved stone from the late 5th century from the frame of an entrance door of a church, with a mosaic Greek inscription. The inscription reads “Christ born of Mary."This work of the most God-fearing and pious bishop [Theodo]sius and the miserable Th[omas] was built from the foundation. Whoever enters should pray for them”. According to archaeologist Dr. Walid Atrash, Theodosius was one of the first Christian bishops and he served as the regional archbishop. This church was the first evidence of the Byzantine church’s existence in Taybeh.

Crusader period
During the Crusader period there was a castle here called (Le) Forbelet (in medieval Arabic: 'Afrabala). It was probably Hospitaller and dependent on nearby Belvoir. Yaqut (1179–1229) noted about the village, which he called Afrabala: "A place in the Jordan Ghaur (or low-land), near Baisan and Tabariyyah."

In July 1182 the castle was the background of the pitched large-scale Battle of Forbelet between Baldwin IV and Saladin. The castle was sacked by Saladin in 1183, and occupied by the Muslims besieging Belvoir in 1187-88. Parts of the castle keep's basement still survive, as do other installations from the Crusader period. Recent excavations indicate that new buildings were constructed alongside the partially destroyed Crusader castle in Mamluk and Ottoman times.

Ottoman period
Taibe was incorporated into the Ottoman Empire in 1517 with all of Palestine, and in 1596 it appeared in the tax registers under the name of Tayyibat al-Ism as being in the Nahiya of Shafa of the Liwa of Lajjun. It had a population of 13 Muslim households and paid taxes on wheat, barley, summer crops, and goats or beehives; a total of 5,300 Akçe. Pierre Jacotin named the village Taibeh on his map from 1799.

In 1875, the French explorer Victor Guérin visited the village and described it as poor, but formerly an important city, while in 1882 the Palestine Exploration Fund's Survey of Western Palestine described Taibe as: "A straggling village, of moderate size, lying on flat ground, and containing several good stone houses. There is one in the middle of the village, belonging to the Sheikh, which is larger than the rest."

British Mandate

In a census conducted in 1922 by the British Mandate authorities, Taibeh had a population of 220, all Muslim, while at the time of the 1931 census, At-Taiyiba had 43 occupied houses and a population of 186 Muslims.

In the 1945 statistics Taibe had a population of 280 Muslims counted with 150 Jews at Moledet) with 7,127 dunams of land, according to an official land and population survey. Of this, 7,103 dunams were used for cereals, while 22 dunams were built-up land.

State of Israel
Since 1948 Taibe has been part of the state of Israel. To mark Israel's 60th anniversary in 2008, the dome of the local mosque was painted in the Israeli colors, blue and white.

Nearly all the residents of Taibe are members of the Zuabi family, one of the larger 48-Palestinian clans.

See also
Arab localities in Israel

References

Bibliography

  

 
 

 
 

 RHC Or vol. 4, 1898,  Recueil des historiens des croisades (p. 345, cf p. 303)

External links
 Welcome To Kh. al-Tayiba
Survey of Western Palestine, Map 9:  IAA, Wikimedia commons, where it is listed as et Taiyibeh

Arab villages in Israel
Populated places established in 1920
Populated places in Northern District (Israel)
Castles and fortifications of the Knights Hospitaller